Kanakysaurus is a genus of skinks.

Species
The following 2 species, listed alphabetically by specific name, are recognized as being valid: They are endemic to New Caledonia.

Kanakysaurus viviparus Sadlier, Whitaker, Bauer, & Smith, 2004
Kanakysaurus zebratus Sadlier, Smith, Whitaker, & Bauer, 2008

Nota bene: A binomial authority in parentheses indicates that the species was originally described in a genus other than Kanakysaurus.

References

 
Lizard genera
Taxa named by Ross Allen Sadlier
Taxa named by Anthony Whitaker
Taxa named by Aaron M. Bauer
Taxa named by Sarah A. Smith